Nea Makri is a town in East Attica, Greece. Since the local government reform of 2011, it has been a municipal unit within the municipality of Marathon. The municipal unit has an area of 36.662 km2. It is part of the Athens metropolitan area.

Geography

Nea Makri is situated on the coast of the Petalioi Gulf, a gulf of the Aegean Sea, in the easternmost part of the Attica peninsula. It is 7 km north of Rafina, 8 km south of Marathon and 25 km northeast of Athens city centre. The municipal unit Nea Makri also contains the village Neos Voutzas, 5 km south of Nea Makri town centre. Greek National Road 83 (Athens - Marathon - Rafina) passes through Nea Makri.

Popular locations near Nea Makri include Zoumberi Beach and the Brexiza Wetland. It is widely known and visited due to its beaches and coastline.

History 
The area was once known as Plesti, but following the 1922 Greek military disaster in Asia Minor and the subsequent expulsion of the native Greeks of Makri in Turkey, it was renamed Nea Makri (New Makri) by the refugees who settled there.

The United States Navy operated a HF radio communications base north of Nea Makri from the mid to the late 20th century. The transmitters were located further north, at Kato Souli. The call sign of the station was NGR. The American naval communications station was the deployment location for Naval Mobile Construction Battalion 133, home-ported in Gulfport, MS.

Saint Ephraim the martyr was a monk who may have lived in the Monastery of the Annunciation in Nea Makri; it has become an important monastery in recent years and has become a site of pilgrimage for all Greeks.

Population

See also
List of municipalities of Attica

References

Closed installations of the United States Navy
Marathon, Greece
Populated places in East Attica